The Alexandra Road estate (officially the Alexandra and Ainsworth estate, but often referred to as Rowley Way, the name of its main thoroughfare) is a housing estate in the London Borough of Camden, North West London, England. It was designed in a brutalist style in 1968 by Neave Brown of Camden Council's Architects Department. Construction work commenced in 1972 and was completed in 1978. It is constructed from site-cast, board-marked white, unpainted reinforced concrete. Along with 520 apartments, the site also includes a school, community centre, youth club, heating complex, and parkland.

Estate 
The estate consists of three parallel east–west blocks, and occupies a crescent-shaped site bounded on the south by Boundary Road, Loudoun Road on the east, Abbey Road on the west, and by the West Coast Main Line to the north. The desire to control the sound and vibration from passing trains was a major consideration in the layout of the estate. Two rows of terraced apartments are aligned along the tracks. The higher, eight-story block directly adjacent to the railway line is organised in the form of a ziggurat, and acts as a noise barrier that blocks the noise of the trains from reaching the interior portion of the site, and its foundations rest on rubber pads that eliminate vibration. A lower, four-storey block runs along the other side of a continuous pedestrian walkway, known as Rowley Way, serving both terraced rows of buildings. The third row of buildings, along the southern edge of the site, parallels another public walkway, Langtry Walk, between this row and the existing earlier buildings of the Ainsworth Estate and defines a public park with play areas between the second and third row of dwellings.

The lower four-storey building along Rowley Way contains maisonettes with shared access, terraces, and gardens over-looking the park at the rear. Maisonettes also occupy the top two levels of the larger eight-storey building opposite, with entrance from a walkway on the 7th floor that runs the entire length of the structure. Dwellings in the lower floor in this block  are entered from open stairs serving two dwellings per floor. The flat roofs of the stepped elevation provides private outdoor areas for every home. Garage parking is located beneath the building, and underneath the building at the rear alongside the railway tracks.

Development and history 
Since the early 1950s, tower blocks surrounded by public open space had been the method of choice for councils to replace terraced housing in poor condition while keeping the same high population density. However, by the mid-1960s, even before the collapse of Ronan Point, the shortcomings of that method were becoming apparent. Neave Brown believed that ziggurat style terraces, little higher than the terraces they replaced, could provide a better solution.  Vehicular traffic could be restricted to basement level.  Family-sized flats, bright and airy due to the set-back upper floors, could open, via their own "defensible" front garden, onto ground floor streets/play areas, whilst the higher levels could be used for smaller flats, each with a private balcony.

The Alexandra Road Estate may be seen as Brown's culminating, and largest scale, effort to apply these principles to the design of high-density public housing. Five houses on Winscombe Street, built in 1967, were his first experiment with the terrace type. The Fleet Road project, begun about the same time and consisting of 71 houses, a shop, and a studio, arranged in parallel terraced rows, was a further application of the idea.

Public enquiry 
The estate received much criticism during and after its construction because of its very high cost (particularly compared with tower blocks), caused by the complicated nature of its construction, unforeseen foundation problems, and the delays caused by those at a time of very high inflation, reaching 20% per year at one point in the 1970s. In 1978 a public enquiry was launched by the Labour-run council to investigate the reasons for overshooting the budget and timetable.

Although there were indeed a significant delay and an increase in cost of approximately four times the originally commissioned tender, the enquiry may have been politically motivated. Mark Swenarton cites several factors for its launch: The campaigning Conservatives tried to allege that Labour was incompetent in managing the council and an increasingly pressured Labour hoping to relieve itself from the public anger of the spending by raising the transparency and potentially find the roots of the problem with the Conservative leadership 1968–1971.

The outcome of the enquiry published in seven reports mainly made "the apparent failure of the councillors to understand the contractual obligations that they had undertaken" responsible for the mismanagement and was not successful in blaming the architect as had been hoped by some. Despite there being no findings of a mismanagement on his part, however, being the subject of a public enquiry destroyed Neave Brown's reputation in the UK where he never built again.

Alexandra Road Estate today 
The estate has suffered less vandalism than many Camden estates, and it was granted Grade II* listed status on 18 August 1993, the first post-war council housing estate to be listed. It was described by Peter Brooke, then Heritage Secretary, as "one of the most distinguished groups of buildings in England since the Second World War."

After a continuing career including international town planning and post-graduate teaching, Brown retrained as a fine artist, to which occupation he devoted his retirement. In October 2017, Brown won the Royal Gold Medal of the Royal Institute of British Architects. Brown died, aged 88, in January 2018.

In popular culture

The brutalist architecture of the estate has been used as background or location in a number of films:

 Scenes of the estate under construction can be seen in "Down to You, Brother", a 1976 episode of the TV series The Sweeney.
 Setting of the 2000 ITV film A Christmas Carol.
 Shown in 2003 at the beginning of "Spiders", an episode of the BBC drama Spooks.
Featured in “Mask of Sanity”, a series 6 episode of the BBC drama “Waking the Dead”
 Given the fictitious name Marbatan Estates, the site served as a principal location in the 2014 episode "Undertone" of the TV series Silent Witness.
 The home of the characters Miro and Amira in the 2006 film Breaking and Entering
 The estate was used in the 2014 film Kingsman: The Secret Service. It is the housing Gary "Eggsy" Unwin (actor Taron Egerton) and his family resides in after his father's death.
 In "Prime Suspect: The Final Act", series 7 of the British police procedural television drama series starring Helen Mirren, character Curtis Flynn is shown attempting to escape from police capture by jumping and scaling between apartment terraces in the estate.
 Shown in Episode 7, “The Russian Cousin”, of the 12th and final series of BBC's New Tricks, where Steve McAndrew (actor Denis Lawson) and DCI Sasha Miller (actor Tamzin Outhwaite) stroll down the central pedestrian walkway discussing the case.
 Appeared in Series 2, Episode 5 of ITV’s Primeval as the home of a young girl who discovers an anomaly.
 Featured in BBC Two drama London Spy as the home of the parents of lead character Daniel Edward Holt.
 The two-part Channel 4 TV movie Never Never with John Simm and Sophie Okonedo is set in the Alexandra Road Estate.
 The estate features in the 2017 city-symphony film London Symphony, a fusion of silent film and classical music which offers a poetic journey through the capital.  
 In the 2017 Channel 4 sci-fi adaptation of Philip K. Dicks short stories, Electric Dreams, several night scenes of the first episode (titled "The Hood Maker") are filmed in the estate. Shots of A Block and the underground road feature.
The 2018 BBC TV series Hard Sun features the estate as the site of a brutal stabbing and the subsequent police investigation.
Homes Under The Hammer
 The 2021 ITV drama 'Angela Black' features the estate in episodes 5 and 6.

It has also featured in a number of music videos and album covers including:
 Richard and Linda Thompson – Sunnyvista
 Foals – "Mountain At My Gates"
 The 1975 – "Somebody Else"
 Kirsty Maccoll – "A New England"
 Jarryd James – "Do You Remember"
 Omi Palone – "Architecture"
 Slew Dem Mafia – "Nothing Like Yours"
 Marger – "My Thing" (2010)
 Arcane Roots – "Curtains"
 J Hus – "Calling Me" (2015)
 Paul Van Dyk – "Another Way" (1999)
 Filo & Peri – "Anthem" (2007)
 Smiler – "Brand New Style" (2013)
 Oneohtrix Point Never — "Sticky Drama/Sticky Drama - Prologue" (2015)
 Chlöe Howl – "Do It Alone" (2017)
 Joel Corry x MNEK – "Head & Heart" (2020)
 Dua Lipa x Angèle Van Laeken - "Fever" (2020)
 Fontaines D.C. – "A Lucid Dream" (2020)
Ink, Loxy & Resound feat. Jody Lulati & Miriam Safo - "Phoenix Rising" (2021)
Tricky - 'Nothing Matters' feat. Nneka

Other sites
The Highgate New Town/Whittington Estate by Peter Tábori has a similar design.

References

Further reading

External links

 Municipal Dreams: The Alexandra Road Estate, Camden: ‘a magical moment for English housing’, a blog article including an extensive list of sources.
 One Below the Queen: Rowley Way Speaks for Itself A 2010 documentary made by Alexandra Road estate residents themselves. Viewable online.
 Alexandra & Ainsworth Estate Tenants and Residents Association

Brutalist architecture in London
Grade II* listed buildings in the London Borough of Camden
Housing estates in the London Borough of Camden
Ziggurat style modern architecture
1978 establishments in England